Leskovets (Bulgarian: Лесковец, also transliterated Leskovec) is a village in western Bulgaria. Its located in Oblast Pernik, Obshtina Pernik.

Geography 
The village of Leskovets is located in a mountainous region. Its located 2.5 km west of Batanovtsi.

Cultural and natural landmarks 
Below the village there is a dam called Bushlyak, above the village is the Kavatsite dam, and even higher is the Lobosh dam.

In the village there is a ZOO - Alis.

Name 

The name derives from Leska, which means Hazel in Bulgarian + the Slavic suffix -ets.

Political situation 
The village shares a mayor with the neighbouring village of Planinitsa.

References

 www.grao.bg
guide-bulgaria.com

Villages in Pernik Province